Kurt Innes (born 4 February 1971) is a Canadian former cyclist. He competed in the track time trial at the 1992 Summer Olympics. He later became a coach for the national team.

References

External links
 

1971 births
Living people
Canadian male cyclists
Olympic cyclists of Canada
Cyclists at the 1992 Summer Olympics
People from Deloraine, Manitoba
Cyclists from Manitoba
20th-century Canadian people
21st-century Canadian people